Mikel Unanue (born 24 October 1982 in San Sebastián, Basque Country, Spain) is a Spanish curler.

Teams

Men's

Mixed

Mixed doubles

References

External links

 

Living people
1982 births
Sportspeople from San Sebastián
Spanish male curlers
Spanish curling champions
21st-century Spanish people